Fanny Wilkinson (1855–1951) was a British landscape designer. She was the first professional female landscape designer in Britain, and responsible for the design and the layout of more than 75 public gardens across London in the late 19th century.

Early life 
Fanny Wilkinson was born in 1855 in Manchester, the daughter of Matthew Eason Wilkinson, a prominent doctor who became president of the British Medical Association, and his wife, Louisa.

Education 
She was educated ‘privately and abroad’, but by the end of 1883 she had completed an 18-month course at the Crystal Palace School of Landscape Gardening and Practical Horticulture in London, at a time when such classes were intended only for men. She later said that 'I was always fond of gardening as a child, and I took it up because I felt it suited me, and I wanted to do something …’. She may have been inspired by the grounds of Middlethorpe Hall, the family residence in Yorkshire.

Career 
In 1884 she was elected as honorary gardener to the Metropolitan Public Gardens Association but two years later this was changed to a professional position for which she was paid a fee. In an interview in 1890 she commented that ‘I certainly do not let myself be underpaid as many women do. … I know my profession and charge accordingly, as all women should do.’ Among the many public gardens across London that she planned and that were laid out under her supervision were Goldsmith’s Square, Hackney; Myatt’s Fields Park, Camberwell; Paddington Street Gardens, Marylebone; Meath Gardens, Bethnal Green; and the churchyard of St John, Smith Square, Westminster.

In 1887 Fanny Wilkinson was also working as a landscape designer to the Kyrle Society, which aimed to ‘bring beauty to the lives of the poor’. Through the society she was commissioned to design Vauxhall Park, opened in 1890. This was created on land saved from development and purchased by Henry Fawcett and Millicent Garrett Fawcett; Millicent and her sisters became good friends of Fanny. Fanny's sister Louisa married Millicent’s brother.

In 1902 she became the first female Principal of Swanley Horticultural College and in that post she encouraged other women to enter the profession. She co-founded the Women’s Agricultural and Horticultural International Union (1899), through which women were recruited to sustain agriculture and food production during the First World War. The organisation continues as the Working For Gardeners Association.

Commemoration 
In 2022 English Heritage announced that Fanny Wilkinson would be commemorated with a blue plaque at her former home in Bloomsbury, London, later that year. She was nominated for the plaque by the Metropolitan Public Gardens Association, the organisation which kickstarted her professional career.

References 

1855 births
1951 deaths
People from Manchester
British landscape and garden designers